The 2018 Asian Karate Championships were the 15th edition of the Asian Karate Championships, and were held in Amman, Jordan from July 13 to July 15, 2018.

Medalists

Men

Women

Medal table

References
Results
Medal table

External links
 WKF

Asian Championships
Asian Karate Championships
Asian Karate Championships
Asian Karate Championships
Sports competitions in Amman